Cyanthillium cinereum (also known as little ironweed and poovamkurunnal or poovamkurunnila in Malayalam, and monara kudumbiya in Sinhalese) is a species of perennial plants in the sunflower family. The species is native to tropical Africa and to tropical Asia (India, Sri Lanka, Indochina, Indonesia, etc.) and has become naturalized in Australia, Mesoamerica, tropical South America, the West Indies, and the US State of Florida.

Cyanthillium cinereum is an annual herb up to 120 cm (4 feet) tall. It produces flat-topped arrays of numerous flower heads, each with pinkish or purplish disc florets but no ray florets. The species can be confused with Emilia sonchifolia, but the flower bracts of the latter are much longer and vase-shaped.

Cyanthillium cinereum has been used for smoking cessation in Thailand and other countries, and as relief for the common cold.

It used to be called Vernonia cinerea, but apparently there was a taxonomic update, sometime prior to early 2014.

References

External links
Global Information Hub on Integrated Medicine

cinereum
Flora of Asia
Flora of Africa
Plants described in 1753
Taxa named by Carl Linnaeus